The following are the national records in athletics in Albania maintained by the Albanian Athletics Federation (FSHA).

Outdoor

Key to tables:

+ = en route to a longer distance

h = hand timing

A = affected by altitude

# = not recognised by World Athletics

NWI = no wind information

Men

Women

Indoor

Men

Women

Notes

References
General
Albanian records 31 December 2021 updated
Specific

External links
FSHA web site

Albania
Athletics
Records
Athletics